The 1912 Campeonato Paulista, organized by the LPF (Liga Paulista de Football), was the 11th season of São Paulo's top association football league. Americano won the title for the 1st time. no teams were relegated and the top scorer was Mackenzie's Arthur Friedenreich with 16 goals.

System
The championship was disputed in a double-round robin system, with the team with the most points winning the title.

Championship

Despite the fact that AA das Palmeiras had left the league the previous year, the championship expanded, with the return of Mackenzie and Internacional. The last four matches of the championship were cancelled because a São Paulo XI team would tour Rio Grande do Sul in November, which would leave the teams short of important players if the matches were to be held.

References

Campeonato Paulista seasons
Paulista